Cyril Buscaglione (born 24 March 1972) is a retired French tennis player.

Buscaglione has a career high ATP singles ranking of 286 achieved on 28 October 1996. He also has a career high doubles ranking of 268 achieved on 7 October 1996.

Buscaglione has won 1 ATP Challenger doubles title at the 1997 Tampere Open.

Tour titles

Doubles

References

External links
 
 

1972 births
Living people
French male tennis players